DeWald Glacier is a glacier  long draining the northeast slopes of Bramble Peak in the Victory Mountains of Victoria Land. The glacier flows northwest to merge with the terminus of Lensen Glacier where both glaciers join the larger Pearl Harbor Glacier. It was mapped by the United States Geological Survey from surveys and U.S. Navy air photos, 1960–62, and was named by the Advisory Committee on Antarctic Names for Lieutenant Bruce F. DeWald, U.S. Navy, an aerographer with the McMurdo Station winter party in 1963 and 1966, and forecast duty officer at McMurdo Station during the summer seasons of 1972–73 and 1973–74.

References 

Glaciers of Borchgrevink Coast